The Italian Catholic Archdiocese of Brindisi-Ostium in Apulia, has carried its present name since 1986. It is a suffragan of the archdiocese of Lecce.

The historical archdiocese of Brindisi was promoted from a diocese in the tenth century. The territory of the diocese of Ostuni was added to it in 1821. The archdiocese lost its status as metropolitan see in 1980.

History
There is no historical proof for early beginnings of Christianity in Brindisi, except the account given by Arnobius, who died c. 330, of the fall of Simon Magus, who withdrew to Brindisi and cast himself from a high rock into the sea.

According to a local legend, the first Bishop of Brindisi was Leucius of Brindisi, about 165, who later underwent martyrdom. Leucius is called a confessor or, by Pope Gregory I, a martyr. He is said to have been from Alexandria in Egypt, to have come to Brindisi already a bishop, with his archdeacon, and to have baptised some 27,000 people. The earliest account of his life says he died under the Emperor Theodosius; Theodosius I ruled from 379–395, and Theodosius II from 408–450. Other versions put his death under Commodus, between 180 and 192, and yet others place his martyrdom under Valerianus, 253–259. That he was made a bishop from the east rather than one connected with Rome suggests that his story was worked on when Brindisi was subject to Constantinople, between the 8th and 10th centuries.

Oria

The Diocese of Brindisi at first embraced the territory comprised within the present diocese of Oria. In the tenth century, after Brindisi had been destroyed by the Saracens, the bishops took up their abode at Oria, on account of its greater security.

In 1572–1591, during the tenure of the Spanish Bishop Bernardino de Figueroa movements were made to separate Oria as seat of a new diocese. The town was erected into an episcopal see on 8 May 1591 by Pope Gregory XIV, after the death of the Spaniard, Archbishop Bernardino de Figueroa.  After an interval of four and a half years first bishop of Oria was appointed, Vincenzo del Tufo, in 1596.

In the reorganization of the dioceses of the Kingdom of Naples in 1818 Brindisi was combined with the Diocese of Ostuni, formerly its suffragan.

Brindisi has been an archiepiscopal see since the tenth century. The ancient cathedral was located outside the city, but in 1140 Roger II, King of Sicily and Naples, built the present cathedral in the centre of the city.

Synods
A diocesan synod was an irregularly held, but important, meeting of the bishop of a diocese and his clergy. Its purpose was (1) to proclaim generally the various decrees already issued by the bishop; (2) to discuss and ratify measures on which the bishop chose to consult with his clergy; (3) to publish statutes and decrees of the diocesan synod, of the provincial synod, and of the Holy See.

In 1608, Bishop Juan de Falces (1605-1636) presided over a diocesan synod. He held another, his third, on 10 September 1615. A fourth took place on 16 October 1616. A fifth diocesan synod was held on 9 April 1617, and a sixth on 22 April 1618. His seventh synod was held on 8 September 1618, his eighth on 2 May 1621, and his ninth on 10 April 1622.

Bishops of Brindisi

to 1200
Leucius ( ? )
[Marcus (attested 325)]
[Aproculus (Proculus)] 
...
Julianus (attested c.492–496)
...
Pretiosus (6th cent. ?)
...

 Andrea (died 979) 
...
Nardo (c. 1040)
 Eustasius (c.1052–c.1071) 
...
Gregorius ? (attested 1074, 1080 ?)
Archbishops of Brindisi e Oria
Godinus (1085–1098)
Baldwin (attested 1100)
Nicholas (1101–1105)
Guilelmus (1105–1118)
Bajalardus (Bailardo) (1118–1143)<ref>Archbishop(-elect) Bajalardus of Brindisi was present at the consecration of Pope Gelasius II on Sunday 10 March 1118 at Gaeta. His consecration and pallium had to wait, since the Pope fled to Pisa and then to France, where he died. Bajalardus was finally consecrated in February 1122 by Pope Calixtus II, who also made him a Cardinal Deacon of the Roman church. He took part in the transfer of the remains of S. Peregrinus at Trani in 1143. Pandulfus Pisanus, "Vita Gelasii II", in:  Ughelli, pp. 32-33. Guerrieri, pp. 103-104. Klaus Ganzer, Die Entwicklung des auswärtigen Kardinalats im hohen Mittelalter (Tübingen: Max Niemeyer 1963) pp. 74-75. Rudolf Hüls, Kardinäle, Klerus, und Kirchen Roms, 1049–1130 (Tübingen: Max Niemeyer 1963), p. 245.</ref>
Lupus (1144–1172)
Wilelmus (1173–1181)
Petrus (1183–1196)
Girardus (1196–c.1216)

1200 to 1500

Peregrinus (1216–1224)
Petrus de Bisignano (1225–1239?)
Petrus Paparone (1239–1254?)
Peregrinus (1254–1288?)
Adenulfus (1288–1295)
Andreas Pandone (1296–1304)
Radulfus (1304–1306) AdministratorBartholomaeus (1306–1319)
Bertrandus, O.P. (1319–1333)
Guilelmus Isardi, O.Min. (1333-1344)
Guilelmus de Rosières, O.S.B. (1344–1346)
 Galhard de Carceribus (1346–1348)
Joannes de Porta (1348–1352)
Pinus, O.P. (1352–1378?)
Gurellus (1379– ) Avignon ObedienceMarinus del Judice (c.1379–1382) Roman ObedienceRiccardus de Rogeriis (1382–c.1409) Roman ObedienceVictor (1409–1411) Roman ObediencePaulus (Romanus) (1411– ? )
Pandullus (1412–1414) Pisan ObedienceAragonus de Malaspina (1415–1418) Pisan ObediencePaulus (1418–1423)
Petrus Gattula (1423– )
Pietro de Gattula (1423-1437) 
Goffredo Carusio (1453-1471)
Francesco de Arenis (1477-1483) 
Roberto Piscicelli (1484-1513)

1500 to 1800

Domingo Idiocáiz (1513-1518)
Gian Pietro Carafa (1518-1524)
Girolamo Aleandro (1524–1541)
Francesco Aleandro (1541-1560) Sede vacante (1560–1564)
 Giovanni Carlo Bovio (1564–1572)
 Bernardino de Figueroa (1571–1591)
Andrés de Ayardis (1591-1595)
Juan Pedrosa, O.S.B. (1598-1604)
Juan Santisteban de Falces, O.S.Hier. (1605-1636)
Francesco Surgenti (Sorgente), C.R. (1638-1640) 
Dionysius Odriscol, O.F.M. Obs. (1640-1650)
Lorenzo Reynoso (1652-1656)Sede vacante (1656–1659)
Francesco de Estrada (1659-1671)
Alfonso Álvarez Barba Ossorio, O. Carm. (1673–1676)
Manuel de la Torre (1677-1679)
Giovanni de Torrecilla y Cárdenas (1681-1688) 
Francesco Ramírez, O.P. (1689-1697) 
Agustín Antonio de Arellano, O.S.A. (1698-1699) 
Bernabé de Castro, O.S.A. (1700-1707)Sede vacante (1707–1715)
Pablo de Vilana Perlas (1715-1723) 
 Andrea Maddalena (1724–1743)
Antonino Sersale (1743-1750) 
Giovanni Angelo Ciocchi del Monte (1751-1759)
Domenico Rovegno (1759-1763) 
Giuseppe de Rossi (1764-1778)
Giovanni Battista Rivellini (1778-1795)Rivellini:
Annibale Di Leo (1798-1814)

since 1800Sede vacante (1814–1818)
Antonio Barretta, Theat. (1818–1819)
Giuseppe Maria Tedeschi, O.P. (1819-1825)
Pietro Consiglio (1826–1839)
Didacus (Diego) Planeta (1841–1850)
Giuseppe Rotondo (1850-1855)
Raffaele Ferrigno (1856-1875) 
Luigi Maria Aguilar, B. (1875-1892) 
Salvatore Palmieri, C.Pp.S. (1893-1905) 
Luigi Morando, C.S.S. (1906-1909) 
Tommaso Valerio Valeri, O.F.M. (1910-1942) 
Francesco de Filippis (1942-1953) 
Nicola Margiotta (1953-1975) 
Settimio Todisco (1975-2000) 
Rocco Talucci (2000-2012) 
Domenico Caliandro 2012–2022
Giovanni Intini 2022–present

See also
 Timeline of Brindisi

Notes and references

Bibliography
Reference for bishops

Studies

Carito, Giacomo (2007). "Gli arcivescovi di Brindisi sino al 674,"  in: Parola e storia, I, n. 2/ 2007, pp. 197-225.
Carito, Giacomo (2008). "Gli arcivescovi di Brindisi dal VII al X secolo," , in Parola e storia : rivista dell'Istituto superiore di scienze religiose San Lorenzo da Brindisi dell'Arcidiocesi di Brindisi-Ostuni, facoltà teologica pugliese Vol. 2 (2008), n. 2 (4), pp. 289-308.
Carito, Giacomo (2009). "Gli arcivescovi di Brindisi nell'XI secolo," , in Parola e storia Anno 3 (2009), n. 1 (5), pp. 57-78.
Carito, Giacomo (2010). "Gli arcivescovi di Brindisi nel XII secolo," , in: Parola e storia Anno 4 (2010), n. 1 (7), pp. 51-89.
Coco, F. A. (1914). Titoli dignitari e nobiliari della sede arcivescovile di Brindisi. Studio storico critico. Lecce: Giurdignano, 1914. 
Guerrieri, Vito (1848), "Brindisi", in: 
Kamp, Norbert (1975). Kirche und Monarchie im staufischen Königreich Sizilien. I. Prosopographische Grundlegung: 2. Apulien und Kalabrien. München: Wilhelm Fink Verlag. 
Kehr, Paul Fridolin (1962). Italia pontificia. Vol. IX: Samnium — Apulia — Lucania. Berlin: Weidmann. 

Lanzoni, Francesco (1927). Le diocesi d'Italia dalle origini al principio del secolo VII (an. 604)''. Faenza: F. Lega, pp. 305–310, 312, 317.

Acknowledgment

Brindisi
Brindisi
Brindisi